Central Jail Sahiwal is an ancient Jail situated in Sahiwal, Pakistan. It is the largest jail in Asia with regard to the area and agricultural land until construction of High Security Prison and Punjab Prison Staff Training College adjacent to this jail. Ziad Ahmad Kayla Assistant Superintendent jail remained posted 2010 to 2015.

Prison industries

The following prison industries are functioning in the jail to train the convicted prisoners in various trades and handicrafts so that they could earn their living after their release, utilize prison labour in profitable works for benefit of state exchequer and keep the prisoners busy in useful tasks.

 Jute Tot Manufacturing Unit
 Prisoner Blanket Weaving Unit
 Carpet Knitting Unit

See also

 Government of Punjab, Pakistan
 Punjab Prisons (Pakistan)
 Prison Officer
 Headquarter Jail
 National Academy for Prisons Administration
 Punjab Prisons Staff Training Institute

References

External links
 Official Website of Punjab Prisons (Pakistan)

Prisons in Pakistan